Rosalind Hammond, often credited as Ros or Roz, is an Australian actress and writer with an extensive career in theatre, film and television.

Career 
Hammond's television appearances include the role of Claudia in the award-winning drama The Heights, and ten seasons of Shaun Micallef's Mad as Hell, on which she portrayed characters such as Jacquie Lambie’s press secretary Dolly Norman, conservative blogger Vomitoria Catchment, royal watcher Gay March, Tamie Fraser, and ABC shop employee Dianne. She previously worked with Shaun Micallef in three series of The Micallef Programme.

Hammond played the role of librarian Christine Grimwood in three series of the ABC sitcom The Librarians. She was a regular cast member on Thank God You're Here, The Never Too Late Show, Bootleg, Small Tales and True, Eric, Full Frontal, Sky Trackers, Snowy and Micro Nation.

Hammond has made guest appearances on the television series Harrow, Please Like Me, The Letdown, Carla Carmetti, Driven Crazy, Law of the Land, MDA, Miss Fisher's Murder Mysteries, Mr & Mrs Murder, Newstopia, Offspring, Outland, Raw FM, Slide and Welcher and Welcher, and in the TV movie Curtin.

She also wrote for television programs, including ABC Kids series Little Lunch, ABC's It's A Date, SkitHOUSE, Eric Bana's sketch show Eric, Home and Away, The Mick Molloy Show and Small Tales and True.

Hammond is a graduate of the West Australian Academy of Performing Arts, and has appeared in feature films Muriel's Wedding, in which she played Cheryl, one of the bridesmaids, The Dish, The Honourable Wally Norman, and the short film Titsiana Booberini.

Her theatre credits include productions with the Melbourne and Sydney Theatre Companies with roles in Blithe Spirit, The Female of the Species, Happy Endings, Kid Stakes, Secret Bridesmaid's Business and Things We Do For Love.

Her one-woman show, Full Blown Rose, had successful international tours to the Dublin Fringe Festival (where she was nominated for Best Female Performance) and the Glasgow Millers International Comedy Festival. At the 2005 Melbourne International Comedy Festival, she received a Golden Gibbo nomination.

At the 2013 Melbourne International Comedy Festival, she performed Gym and Tonic, based on her "other career" as a personal trainer at an all-women's gym. The production then toured nationally.

References

External links 

 Roz Hammond's website

Year of birth missing (living people)
Living people
Australian film actresses
Australian stage actresses
Australian television actresses
20th-century Australian dramatists and playwrights
Australian women dramatists and playwrights
21st-century Australian dramatists and playwrights
21st-century Australian women writers
20th-century Australian women writers
Actresses from Perth, Western Australia